KEFX is a radio station broadcasting from Twin Falls, Idaho, United States, and airing a Christian Rock format. The station operates on a frequency of 88.9 MHz FM with an effective radiated power of 100 kW at 302 meters height above average terrain and is owned by CSN International. KEFX is the flagship station of Effect Radio, and its broadcast is sent to two other full powered stations and 53 translators across the United States. Current Effect Radio DJ's and Radio Personalities are AJ Kestler & Ryan D Downs. The Effect Radio Network is a sister station to KAWZ, which is the flagship station of the more widely distributed CSN International.

References

External links
 Effect Radio website
 

EFX